Nr. 10 is a Dutch feature film by Alex van Warmerdam. The film had its national theatrical release on 30 September 2021, on the closing night of the Netherlands Film Festival. That same evening, the film was scheduled to premiere in another one-hundred cinemas across the Netherlands.

Plot
Günter, found in a German forest as a four-year old, grows up in a foster family. Four decades later, he leads a normal life: he earns a living as a stage actor, spends time with his daughter Lizzy, and has an affair with a married woman. He doesn't start wondering about his origins until a stranger on a bridge whispers a single word in his ear.

Cast
 Tom Dewispelaere - Günter
Frieda Barnhard - Lizzy
Hans Kesting - Karl
Anniek Pheifer - Isabel
Pierre Bokma - Marius
Dirk Böhling - Wassinski
Mandela Wee Wee - Innocence
 Richard Gonlag - Poelzig
 Gene Bervoets - Reichenbach

References

External links 
 

2021 films
Dutch thriller films
2020s Dutch-language films